The Sacred Heart Cathedral also called Buôn Ma Thuột Cathedral is a religious building that is affiliated with the Catholic Church and is found in 2 Phan Chu Trinh in the city of Buon Ma Thuot, capital of Dak Lak province in the southern part of the Asian country of Vietnam.

Construction of the church began in 1957 and was completed the following year with space for 1,200 faithful seated.

The temple follows the Roman or Latin rite and is the principal church of the Diocese of Ban Me Thuot (Dioecesis Banmethuotensis or Giáo phận Ban Mê Thuột) which was created in 1967 by Pope Paul VI by bull Qui Dei benignitate.

The Cathedral is under the pastoral responsibility of the Bishop Vincent Nguyễn Văn Bản.

See also
Roman Catholicism in Vietnam
Sacred Heart Cathedral (disambiguation)

References

Roman Catholic cathedrals in Vietnam
Buon Ma Thuot
Roman Catholic churches completed in 1958
20th-century Roman Catholic church buildings in Vietnam